Voltron: Legendary Defender is an animated mecha series produced by American companies DreamWorks Animation Television and World Events Productions and animated by South Korean studio Mir for Netflix. It is a reboot of the Voltron franchise and the Japanese anime series Beast King GoLion, and its animation is a mix of anime-influenced traditional animation for characters and backgrounds and CGI for Voltron action sequences. Voltron: Legendary Defender is set in a science fiction universe where planetary energy called "quintessence" can be used to power vehicles and magic. The series follows the adventures of the Paladins of Voltron who must learn to work together to form the legendary robot Voltron and use it to defeat the Emperor Zarkon and the Galra Empire.

Voltron: Legendary Defender received generally positive reviews from critics, highlighting the series' writing and visuals. However, the series was involved in various controversies surrounding LGBT representation. The series' success has spawned several comics, action figures, and other toys from Playmates Toys.

Synopsis
For millennia, the Galra Empire has plagued the universe by destroying civilizations and enslaving various races. The only threat to the empire is the legendary "Defender of the Universe" Voltron, a 328-foot-tall robot warrior composed of five lion-styled starships whose pilots are known as Paladins. At the crux of the war that ended with the destruction of planet Altea, King Alfor separated Voltron to protect him from falling into the evil Galra King Zarkon's possession. King Alfor sent the Voltron Lions across the universe to different locations to hide them from Emperor Zarkon. Princess Allura, Alfor's royal adviser Coran, and the Altean Castle of Lions were hidden on planet Arus along with the Black Lion.

In the present, the Galra Empire's path of conquest and search for Voltron has led them to Earth's solar system. A group of space pilots—Shiro, Keith, Lance, Pidge, and Hunk—discover the Blue Lion and immediately get swept up into the Galran War. They meet Princess Allura, become the new Paladins, and reunite the five Lions to form Voltron, beginning their fight to liberate the universe from the Galra Empire.

Cast and characters

Main

Voltron Force

 Josh Keaton as Lieutenant / Commander Takashi "Shiro" Shirogane:The Black Paladin and the pilot of the Black Lion. The leader of the Defenders of the Universe, Shiro was captured by the Galra Empire a year before the start of the series while on a scientific expedition, during which he was given a weaponized prosthetic right arm. A natural, decisive leader, Shiro is calm and always in control. At the end of the second season, Shiro reclaims his personal bayard weapon from Zarkon that enables them to defeat him, but Shiro mysteriously vanishes afterwards. In season three, Shiro wakes up on a Galran batteship. He escapes and is eventually found by the other Paladins. After finding that the Black Lion no longer accepts him as its true paladin, he continues to aid the team by providing guidance and support to them from the Castle of Lions. At the start of season four, Shiro manages to reestablish his bond with the Black Lion when Keith was absent during an intense battle. In season five, he was revealed of being an unwitting mole of Haggar, who can see through his eyes to keep an eye on Lotor. After Keith and Romelle revealed Lotor's true intentions, Haggar takes full control over Shiro, and Keith discovers that the Shiro with them is a clone, while the true Shiro died during the fight at the end of season two, and his soul lies inside the Black Lion. Afterwards, Shiro is revived when Allura uses her powers to transfer his soul from the Black Lion to the clone's body. In season 7, following his return to Earth, he becomes the captain of the Atlas, a Galaxy Garrison battleship, during the fight against Sendak. Throughout the last season (8), Shiro remains the captain of the Atlas and eventually aids in the final battle against Honerva after Voltron merged with the Atlas. At the end of season 8, he married Curtis, a fellow crewmember on the Atlas.
 Kimberly Brooks as Princess Allura:The crown Princess of Altea, the daughter of King Alfor, Allura was the last known female Altean. Pilot and keeper of the Castle of Lions, a structure that is both a castle and a spaceship, Allura granted the new group of Defenders their titles and leads them in their mission to defeat Zarkon and liberate the universe from Galra rule. Allura wishes more than anything to finish her father's work in stopping Zarkon. In season three, she becomes the new pilot of the Blue Lion and replaces Lance as the Blue Paladin (Lance replaces Keith as the Red Lion's paladin). As an Altean, Allura's abilities include the chameleon-like ability to blend in with other species and magical abilities related to quintessence. She has a telepathic bond with some Altean mice that had ended up in the same cryo-pod that she was hibernating inside of. During season 8, Allura and Lance engage in a romantic relationship. At the end of season 8, she and Honerva give their lives to restore all realities after they were destroyed by Honerva in the final battle.
 Steven Yeun as Keith:The Red Paladin and the pilot of the Red Lion. Formerly a cadet at Galaxy Garrison academy before being expelled, Keith is an orphan. Sullen and temperamental, Keith spends his time away from the Garrison after he was expelled working on a mystery he discovered after living in the desert, near the canyons where the Blue Lion was residing. In season two, Keith discovers he has Galra blood, apparently from his maternal side of the family. The revelation comes from a knife that associated him with a secret rebel group of the Galra called the "Blade of Marmora", but also ends up straining Allura's trust in him for a while. Due to Shiro's absence, Keith takes over as the head of Voltron as the new pilot of the Black Lion in season three. At the start of season four, Keith steps down from this position and hands it back to Shiro so that he can continue to work with the Blade of Marmora. At the end of season five, Keith is reunited with his Galra mother, Krolia. He rejoins the Paladins in the end of season six, re-assuming command of the Black Lion. At the end of season 8, he dissolves the Galra Empire and transitions the Blades of Marmora into a humanitarian organization.
 Jeremy Shada as Lance:The Blue Paladin and the pilot of the Blue Lion. Lance was the fighter pilot of his team at Galaxy Garrison academy. Initially cocky and confident, Lance nicknames himself the "sharpshooter" and the "ladies' man" of the Defenders. The first nickname stuck, the other didn't. Lance maintained a one-sided rivalry with Keith from when the two were at the Galaxy Garrison together, but the two have shown to be an effective team. Lance occasionally has doubts of fulfilling his role on the team.  Lance later becomes the new pilot of the Red Lion and right-hand man of Voltron from season three onward. Lance nearly died at the start of season 6, but was saved by Allura's Altean life-giving magic. He and Allura begin a romance at the beginning of season 8. After the final battle with Honerva, Lance gained Altean markings, and returns to live on his family's farm, spreading Allura's message of peace.
 Bex Taylor-Klaus as Katie "Pidge Gunderson" Holt:The Green Paladin and the pilot of the Green Lion. Katie disguised herself as a boy named Pidge Gunderson to get into Galaxy Garrison academy to find out what happened to her father and brother who disappeared whilst on the same scientific mission that Shiro was captured on. Being a technical genius, Pidge is the smartest member of the team, able to create specialist modifications for the Green Lion such as a cloaking device. During her time as a Paladin, she eventually rescued her brother, and then her father. Her brother, Matt, kept fighting for a rebel group, and her father, Sam, returned to Earth to warn the Galaxy Garrison about the impending war against the Galra. After the final battle in Season 8, she and her family help establish and lead the next generation of Legendary Defenders (the nature of whom can be seen to be a nod to Vehicle Voltron). 
 Tyler Labine as Hunk:The Yellow Paladin and the pilot of the Yellow Lion. Hunk was the engineer of his team at Galaxy Garrison academy. A gentle giant with an equally large appetite, Hunk is the heart of the team, lifting them up and inspiring others. In season one, Hunk meets an Balmeran named Shay, whom he develops a kindred friendship with. Like Pidge, his position as the Yellow Paladin doesn't change throughout the course of the show, and in season 3, he helped Allura gain confidence in her newfound position as the Blue Paladin. In season seven, Keith helps Hunk attempt to save his family from Sendak's slave camps. This didn't end up working out though, but Hunk does finally succeed when he and his fellow Paladins liberated Earth from Galran rule, and his family is rescued. At the start of season eight, Hunk encourages Lance to ask Allura out, and even helps him in doing so. Following the final battle with Honerva, he starts up a culinary empire to bring worlds together, one meal at a time.
 Rhys Darby as Coran Hieronymus Wimbleton Smythe:The Royal advisor to Princess Allura's family, Coran was the last known male Altean. Energetic and excitable, Coran serves Allura dutifully whilst being fiercely protective of her. Despite his odd and silly character, he is a reliable and steadfast ally to the princess and the Paladins. Coran was also instrumental in getting liberated planets to join the Voltron Coalition in seasons three to five, through shows and speeches that Coran himself organized. After the Castle of Lions was destroyed at the end of season six, Coran is assigned to help aboard the IGF-Atlas as the flight commander. At the end of season eight, he is seen helping put Altea in order and still maintains a great relationship with the former Paladins of Voltron.

Galra Empire
 Neil Kaplan as King Zarkon:The ruler of the ruthless Galra Empire, and the ruler of most of the known universe after spending the last ten thousand years conquering it. He desires the Lions of Voltron, whom he is powerful to contend against, due to both the threat they pose to his conquest, along with the revelation that he was the former Black Paladin that motivates his claim of the Lions as his own property. During the season two finale, Zarkon faces Voltron and the Paladins in a powerful, experimental mecha armor and is defeated by the Paladins, but left in a coma for most of season three until he was revived by Haggar and begins a manhunt for Lotor. In season five, Lotor fights him in a duel to the death and is slain by Lotor's hand and he is declared dead by the empire. In season 8, Zarkon appears as a corrupted spirit inside of Honerva's mind to protect her secrets. When the original and present Paladins fight and defeat him, they purified his soul and returns to normal after millennia. Then when Allura shows him all the suffering he has caused in all that time, Zarkon becomes repentant. The old and new Paladins convince him to help them escape her mind using the combined shared bond of all ten Paladins to Voltron.
 Cree Summer as Witch Haggar / Honerva:Zarkon's primary advisor and high priestess of the Druids, dark mystics who fanatically serve the Galra Empire. Haggar is both a dangerous sorceress and a mad scientist. She combines her dark magic with abominable science to arm soldiers with powerful weapons, create giant robotic monsters dubbed "Robeasts" to fight Voltron, and drain the mystical life energy known as quintessence from living things and planets to fuel the Galra Empire. In battle, her magical abilities allow for her to teleport, cast illusions, and wield dark energy. Haggar is eventually revealed to be an Altean alchemist named Honerva, Zarkon's wife who played a role in Voltron's origins ten millennia ago. She was afflicted by the same corruption that had transformed Zarkon, in the process losing all the memories of her former life, and gradually recovered them when she traveled to the mystical realm of Oriande where Altean alchemy originated. The trip allowed Haggar to restore herself to her original state as Honerva. While she was absent in season 7, Honerva returns as the main antagonist of season 8. She has deceived a colony of Alteans Lotor had kept hidden from the Galra into becoming her willing followers, promising them they will be reunited with Lotor and Altea. Her plan is to summon Lotor's Sincline and merge it with her own personal mech, creating the ultimate Robeast that can tear open rips to alternate realities. With it, she could then find and travel to the perfect reality to live in peace in, but at the cost of all other realities being destroyed by these rips. It gets worse when the reality she thinks is the perfect one only causes more pain. Outraged, she tries and nearly succeeds in ending all of existence during the final battle, but is convinced by the Paladins and Allura to stop, though she becomes disheartened that there is now only one reality left because of her actions. She and Allura work together to use all their Altean magic to save all of existence, sacrificing their lives to do this.
 A. J. Locascio as Prince Lotor:The son of Zarkon and Honerva, making him a Galra-Altean hybrid. He assumed control of the Galra Empire following his father's inability to lead while in critical condition. Possessing a Messianic complex, Lotor's ideology that strength comes from worthy followers from conquered worlds, rather than resource expansion and subjugation, is reflected in his personal all-female strike team who are half-Galra like himself. While acting as ruler, ignoring matters he deems a waste of time, Lotor has been working on his own plans to obtain Quintessence which results with him branded an outlaw by Zarkon once he returns to power. Forming an alliance with the Paladins after saving them from Haggar's ambush, Lotor manages to win back the Galra throne after defeating his father in a battle to the death. However, Lotor's alliance with the Paladins falls apart once it is revealed that he secretly saved many Alteans during the past war, hiding them away and allowing them to thrive, only to sacrifice a majority of them so he can use their harvested quintessence for his plans, as revealed by Keith and an Altean from his colony, Romelle. It is eventually revealed that Lotor's goal is to establish a new Altean Empire, one that will even span across other realities, and he will dispose of anything, even his own forces if need be, to achieve it. After his plans and actions are exposed by Romelle, Lotor fights Voltron using his own giant mech formed from his Sincline ships, which has the ability to enter the Quintessence field at will. As the fight enters the Quintessence field, the direct exposure to all the quintessence within it drives Lotor mad with power, just like it did to Zarkon 10,000 years ago. Lotor was defeated, however, after Allura used a skill she learned on Oriande to transer the excess power from Voltron to Lotor. Lotor's Sincline mech overloads, and the Paladins have to leave him in the Quintessence field to die, due to Voltron not being able to handle the amount of power it was absorbing from the field around it.

Production
On January 5, 2016, Netflix and DreamWorks Animation announced a new original animated Voltron series to debut in 2016 as a reboot similar to that of Disney's Ducktales reboot, the expansion of their existing multi-year agreement. Voltron was one of several series planned for initial development and debut in 2016, including Guillermo del Toro's animated Trollhunters. Lauren Montgomery and Joaquim Dos Santos, both known for their work on the Avatar: The Last Airbender and its sequel The Legend of Korra, served as showrunners, while fellow crew member Tim Hedrick served as head writer. On March 25, 2016, at WonderCon, it was announced that the voice cast would consist of Steven Yeun as Keith, Jeremy Shada as Lance, Bex Taylor-Klaus as Pidge, Josh Keaton as Shiro, Tyler Labine as Hunk, Kimberly Brooks as Princess Allura, Rhys Darby as Coran, and Neil Kaplan as Emperor Zarkon. Cree Summer later confirmed that she would be voicing Witch Haggar. The first season premiered on June 10, 2016, and consisted of 13 episodes.

It was announced at San Diego Comic-Con that season two will premiere on Netflix in late 2016. A few months later, at New York Comic Con, it was announced that the second season will premiere on January 20, 2017. The second season saw a special premiere at the New York Comic Con on October 7, 2016, where an episode was shown at the Voltron panel. The second season premiered on Netflix on January 20, 2017, and consisted of 13 episodes.

The third season premiered on Netflix on August 4, 2017, and consisted of 7 episodes. The fourth season premiered in October 2017, and consisted of 6 episodes. The series was revealed at WonderCon 2017 to have a 78-episode commitment from Netflix. 

The fifth season premiered on March 2, 2018, and consisted of 6 episodes.

The sixth season premiered on June 15, 2018, and consisted of 7 episodes.

The seventh season premiered on August 10, 2018, and consisted of 13 episodes.

The eighth and final season premiered on December 14, 2018, and consisted of 13 episodes.

Episodes

Reception 

Voltron: Legendary Defender has received widespread critical acclaim throughout its eight-season run. Reviewers and a number of fans have lauded the series’ plot and story arc. Some critics and fans criticized the series for its handling of its LGBT representation. Additionally for most of its run, the series was plagued by poor behavior by a subset of its fans, with a number of fans issuing death threats to both the cast and crew, including Dos Santos and Montgomery, over decisions and reactions related to representation and "shipping" interests.

The review aggregation website Rotten Tomatoes reported a 100% approval with an average rating of 8.15 for the first season, based on 11 reviews, with Critic Consensus being that "Voltron: Legendary Defender honors its source material with beautifully expressive animation and impactful action."

In reviewing the first season, Max Nicholson of IGN wrote, "DreamWork’s Voltron: Legendary Defender delivers exactly the kind of show you’ve come to expect from the amazing creative team behind The Legend of Korra." He rated the series an 8.9 out of 10. Sarah Moran of ScreenRant similarly gave the series a positive review, writing, "It isn’t trying to reinvent or really improve on the original conceit of Voltron, but Legendary Defender is certainly a welcomed take on a classic cartoon; one that should appeal to fans both new and old." Shamus Kelly from Den of Geek gave the series a perfect score, writing, "Seriously, you won’t be disappointed. It’s something special that doesn’t come around often in television."

In reviewing the final season, Jesse Schedeen of IGN wrote, "Minor storytelling quibbles aside, the final season of Voltron: Legendary Defender captures pretty much everything that has made this series great. The action scenes are fantastic. The story combines humor and character drama better than any season before it. These 13 episodes tie up nearly every loose end on a satisfying note and raise the stakes of the show higher than ever." He rated the season 9.1 out of 10, though he admits, "That said, it would be far more effective to see one of these animated shows acknowledge their LGBT heroes from the very beginning and not save moments like these for the literal last minute; with that rushed reveal (after spending no time establishing Shiro's new relationship or even hinting at it), Voltron relies too much on the audience's affection for Shiro to give the moment resonance, rather than earning an emotional response from its storytelling."

Dave Trumbore of Collider gave the season a perfect score, writing, "The final season of Voltron: Legendary Defender rarely stumbles; the same can be said of the series’ story overall. Honestly the only shortcoming in the storytelling has to do with the way the narrative has handled romantic relationships; that trend continues here. Overall, Season 8 manages to do the seemingly impossible by ramping up the stakes to the utmost, delivering the most powerful emotional resonance between our heroes and villains yet, and wrapping everything up in a tearful, bittersweet, and fully satisfying way. It's not perfect, but it's as close to perfection as we’re going to get in this reality." Shamus Kelly from Den of Geek gave the season a 4 out 5 stars, writing, "The biggest strength of the season is how nearly everyone comes back to play some part in the final season."

Palmer Haasch of Polygon had praised the series, though she criticized the series' LGBT representation. She noted, "The final sequence of the series, like any button on a series finale, was a mixed bag. It was a relief to see Lance reunited with his family; Hunk’s establishing a diplomatic culinary empire is nothing short of a perfect arc" concluding, "Ultimately, Voltron, the vision and artistic pursuit of its creators, was never going to quell the concerns of its fanbase. But taken on its own storytelling merits, the final season remained true to the ideas of found family, collective spirit, and empathetic connection. Voltron: Legendary Defender was an honor to follow, and it’s certain that the series will be remembered both for its compelling narrative and spirited fandom for years to come."

In reviewing the series as a whole, Jacob Oller of Paste Magazine wrote, “Empathy is Voltron’s quintessence, its driving fuel and its prime directive. And now that it’s over, those moving on can list the series alongside Korra and Avatar as one of the most impressive of its time.”

There were a number of negative reviews, mostly revolving around Shiro's wedding scene and for killing off Allura. The Geekiary's Jamie Sugah stated in her official series finale, "On the whole, though, this is a lackluster ending for what had up until now been a well-written show with strong, well-developed characters. Voltron season 8 felt very rushed and out of character, with a poorly thought out and clearly tacked on ending."

The Official Voltron Podcast, Let's Voltron, stated, "Allura's death, as I saw it for a long time, really, really bothered me. I've got to be frank about it. As a father of a seven year daughter, for a TV-Y7/FV show, to kill off one of the few female prominent characters? I mean we've got a lot of strong secondary characters, but among the paladins it's Allura and Pidge and that's it, it bothered me a lot. To me it's a difficult pill to swallow. To me it came entirely out of left field. I kept me trap shut on social media, but I was bothered by it a lot." When speaking of Lotor's death, "I think it was little rough for children. I literally rechecked the ratings of the series when I saw that happen, and it's TV-Y7/FV... but seeing his body there—it's just. We didn't have to see it there, did we?" In regards to Shiro's wedding, "We were told that any kind of relationship developed, it was gonna happen naturally and stuff like that, and obviously this didn't really happen naturally."

LGBT-related controversy and criticism
While the series was generally positively received by critics, reception of the show's LGBT representation was decidedly more mixed. Much of the show's controversy and poor fan behavior swirled around LGBT-related issues.

LGBT representation

While the show had at least five confirmed LGBTQ characters, controversy swirled around its LGBTQ representation. Specifically, it featured three gay characters, Shiro and Adam, who broke up, with Adam dying several years later, and Curtis, a background character introduced in Season 7. At the end of eighth and final season, Shiro is married to Curtis. The series was criticized for its LGBTQ representation. The show was criticized for killing off a gay character, with some saying the show was following a stereotype known as "burying your gays", leading showrunner Joaquim Dos Santos to apologize to fans.Renaldo Metadeen of CBR gave his own take, criticizing the marriage between Shiro and Curtis, calling it "cheap and tacked on," while stating that making a "five-second blip of the wedding...come[s] off as a publicity stunt."

Editing
Criticism of editing primarily regarded LGBT issues, though some were general observations.
On October 22, 2018, a series of leaks of the final episode appeared online of the wedding, in which a different character was seen marrying Shiro. With the release of the final episode it is shown as true.

Further controversy followed with the release of the final season, where Shiro is married to Curtis. In the English audio description, Curtis is referred to as Adam though he is once mentioned to be Curtis in the closed captions of a different episode. The error has since been corrected, but a number of fans have noted this as "evidence" of the "tacked-on" nature of the epilogue.

The supervising producer, episode director, storyboard artist, and animator Kihyun Ryu posted on his Instagram on September 12 a piece of Shiro material, weeks before the season was sent to be dubbed into other languages. In the comments, the show runners tell him to "make it beautiful."

Controversy in Season 8 also swirled around Ezor, a female character who was confirmed to be in a same-sex relationship with fellow general Zethrid.  The character's single line of dialogue was pulled from Kimberly Brooks in a previous season, No audio description ever mentions Ezor's survival within "The Grudge" or its following episode. The lack of movement of the character, only blinking and materializing out of thin air, suggests that the character was meant to remain dead and was added back in at the last minute to appease some negativity.

Carli Squitieri, the storyboard revisionist on "The Grudge", stated on social media after the release of Season 7, "Ezor should have lived, but that's another story I'm not under the authority to speak about."

Fans began a petition for the alleged original season (the version that supposedly existed prior to severe editing), to be released. The petition has garnered over 30,000 signatures.

Speaking in an interview with the "Let's Voltron" podcast Joaquim Dos Santos denied the existence of an alternate cut of season eight.

Fan behavior
The poor behavior of a number of the show's fans was particularly notable. In 2019, it was reported that death threats were issued to many within the Voltron cast and crew, particularly to the showrunners Dos Santos and Montgomery and voice actors Josh Keaton and Bex Taylor-Klaus. Almost all of the negative behavior centered on either LGBT representation or "shipping." In 2019, a fan attempted to blackmail the showrunners, threatening to publicly post private internal documents related to the show if the male characters Keith and Lance were not written to be romantically involved with one another. 

In defense of the executive producers, Tyler Labine, the voice actor for Hunk, stated on his personal Instagram account that "what is not real and what will all fall by the wayside in due time is all the unwarranted hate and vitriol that the dark side of this fandom has let seep into this precious world. THAT is all just noise and I refuse to listen." He also said, in regard to Shiro's epilogue in Season 8, that the "powers that be and people in control aren’t always free to do things the way they want. There is always someone more powerful with lore control keep the gates shut. Just remember that next time you decide that the creators of this show didn’t care about the fandom. I assure they cared more than anybody."

Awards and nominations

Comics
Three comic series detailing events happening in between episodes were announced in January 2016. Taking story ideas that were deemed too outlandish and too epic to be contained in a 23-minute episode from the animated series, these comic series bridges the time lapse between seasons.

Despite original statements of continuing into Volume 4, LionForge opted to cancel its contract. Its only response in regards to the matter was a brief tweet of an article from Geekdad.

Volume 1 (2016)
The first miniseries consisted of five issues, published by Lion Forge Comics. It was written by show head writer Tim Hedrick and Mitch Iverson, and illustrated by Digital Art Chefs. A special cover variant of issue #1 was available at San Diego Comic-Con in 2016, with a limited release of 250 copies. Issue #2 was released on August 2, 2016, followed by issue #3 on October 5, 2016, issue #4 on November 9, 2016, and issue #5 on November 20, 2016. The whole series will be collected in a graphic novel and was initially scheduled for a December 2016 release, but got pushed back to January 3, 2017, then was finally released January 25, 2017, according to Lion Forge. The second series will be announced after the release of the graphic novel. A motion comic of issue 1 with full voice acting by the series cast was released on June 15, 2017, at the DreamWorksTV YouTube channel. The story takes place in between the season 1 episodes "Rebirth" and "Crystal Venom."

Volume 2 (2017)
During the Voltron: Legendary Defender panel at WonderCon 2017, it was announced that the second series of five issues would debut in May 2017. The date was pushed back to late June due to production delays., however the date was pushed back on October 4, 2017 where was published where issue 2 and 3 was published on the same day, November 1, 2017 and issue 4 was published on November 15, 2017, issue 5 was published on December 13, 2017, the Vol. 2 Trade Paperback was published on January 31, 2018. The story takes place in between the season 2 episodes "Shiro's Escape" and "Greening the Cube."

Volume 3 (2018)
Volume 3 debuted on July 11, 2018. The story is set between season 4 and season 5.

Home media
The first two seasons were released on DVD in Region 1 by Universal Pictures Home Entertainment on June 12, 2018, The first two seasons were also released in Australia on October 17, 2018. The series was also releasesd on DVD in the UK, Italy, and Germany.
A box set for seasons 3-6 has been released as of June 2019.
Seasons 1-6 are available on iTunes, Google Play Amazon Video etc in the UK.

Promotion and merchandising
To promote the series in between the release of season 1 and 2, a Robeast fanart contest was announced via social media on October 18, 2016. The winner was announced on December 27, 2016 on social media under the username "Zilla B". Several promotional events were run with the online social game platform Roblox.

Video games

DreamWorks Voltron VR Chronicles (2017) 
A virtual-reality video game based on the series, known as Voltron VR Chronicles, was released for Steam, Oculus and PlayStation 4 via PlayStation Network.

Voltron: Cubes of Olkarion (2019) 
A real-time strategy video game based on the series, called Voltron: Cubes of Olkarion, created by indie developer Gbanga, was entered into and won the 2018 Universal GameDev Challenge. The game was released on Steam Early Access on 29 August 2019. On the 19th September 2019 NBCUniversal shutdown its game publishing division. Three months later on the 19th December Voltron: Cubes of Olkarion was briefly removed from the Steam store, but reactivated in June 2020. In the game, players compete in real-time player vs player (PvP) game battles by placing own and destroying opponent blocks with different features in a game board with a grid.

References

Citations

Sources

External links
 
 
 Voltron at Netflix

2010s American animated television series
2010s American LGBT-related animated television series
2010s American science fiction television series
2016 American television series debuts
2018 American television series endings
American children's animated action television series
American children's animated science fantasy television series
American children's animated space adventure television series
Animated television series reboots
Animation controversies in television
Anime-influenced Western animated television series
English-language Netflix original programming
Fantasy television series
LGBT-related controversies in animation
LGBT-related controversies in television
LGBT speculative fiction television series
Mecha animation
Netflix children's programming
Television series about parallel universes
Television series by DreamWorks Animation
Television series by Studio Mir
Television series by Universal Television
Television series set on fictional planets